Lake Catholic High School is a private Roman Catholic secondary school in Mentor, Ohio, United States. It is affiliated with the Roman Catholic Diocese of Cleveland.

Demographics
The demographic breakdown of the 506 students enrolled for 2019-20 was:
Native American/Alaskan - 0.2%
Asian - 1.2%
Black - 4.5%
Hispanic - 3.0%
White - 86.4%
Native Hawaiian/Pacific islanders - 0.2% 
Multiracial -4.5%

Athletics
The Lake Catholic Cougars compete in the Crown Conference. School colors are green and grey. The following Ohio High School Athletic Association (OHSAA) sanctioned sports are offered:

Baseball (boys) 
Basketball (girls and boys) 
Cross country (girls and boys) 
Football (boys) 
State champion – 1991,1992, 2001
Golf (girls and boys) 
Gymnastics (girls) 
Lacrosse (girls and boys) 
Soccer (girls and boys) 
Softball (girls) 
Swim and dive (girls and boys) 
Tennis (girls) 
Track and field (girls and boys) 
Volleyball (girls) 
 State champion - 2010, 2022
Wrestling (boys)
State champion - 1989

Notable alumni 

Evan Bush; Major League Soccer (MLS) goalkeeper
Joe Jurevicius; National Football League (NFL) wide receiver 
Ben Kelly; NFL cornerback
Eric Kettani; NFL fullback
Ricky Stanzi; NFL and Canadian Football League (CFL) quarterback

References

External links 

High schools in Lake County, Ohio
Catholic secondary schools in Ohio
Mentor, Ohio
Educational institutions established in 1970
Roman Catholic Diocese of Cleveland
1970 establishments in Ohio